{{DISPLAYTITLE:C13H28O}}
The molecular formula C13H28O (molar mass: 200.36 g/mol, exact mass: 200.2140 u) may refer to:

 2,2,4,4-Tetramethyl-3-t-butyl-pentane-3-ol, or tri-tert-butylcarbinol
 1-Tridecanol